Orlando Pirates Football Club (often known as "The Buccaneers") is a South African professional football club based in the Houghton suburb of the city of Johannesburg and plays in the top-tier system of Football in South Africa known as DStv Premiership. The team plays its home matches at Orlando Stadium in Soweto.

The club was founded in 1937 and was originally based in Orlando, Soweto. They were named "amapirate" which means 'Pirates' in IsiZulu after the band of teenagers that originally formed an amateur football club at Orlando Boys Club broke away and started congregating at the home of one of the people that worked at Orlando Boys Club. Orlando Pirates are the first club since the inception of the Premier Soccer League in 1996 to have won three major trophies in a single season back to back, having won the domestic league ABSA Premiership, the FA Cup Nedbank Cup and the Top 8 Cup MTN 8 during the ABSA Premiership 2010–11 season and domestic league ABSA Premiership, the League Cup Telkom Knockout and the Top 8 Cup MTN 8 during the ABSA Premiership 2011–12 season. They are one of only two South African teams with Mamelodi Sundowns to win the CAF Champions League, which they won in 1995. They are the runners-up of the 2015 and 2021–2022 CAF Confederation Cup.

Since their inception, Pirates have won 9 league titles and 35 trophies in total.

History
Orlando Pirates is one of South Africa's oldest football clubs having been established in 1937 in Orlando East, Soweto. The club's performances over the years have served as an inspiration for young footballers to strive to play the Beautiful Game at the highest level in the black and white colours of the 'Buccaneers'.

Early years
The founders of Orlando Pirates included the offspring of migrant workers who moved from rural areas to work in the gold mines of Gauteng. Boys in Orlando came together at every available opportunity in open spaces and in informal groupings to play football. The original club was formed in 1934 by a group of teenagers at the Orlando Boys Club. Andries Mkhwanazi, popularly known as "Pele Pele", was a boxing instructor at the Orlando Boys Club when he encouraged formation of a football club in 1937 and a year later those teenagers were competing among the minors of the Johannesburg Bantu Football Association barefoot and without a team kit.

In 1940, Bethuel Mokgosinyane, the first president, bought the first team kit with his own funds. Orlando Boys participated in Johannesburg Bantu Football Association's Saturday League, where they won the Division Two title and gained promotion to Division One in 1944. Andrew Bassie, a key member of the team, suggested the new name 'Orlando Pirates'. The team composed the camp's war cry 'Ezimnyama Ngenkani'.

Since 1971

Over the years, Orlando Pirates – also known as 'The Happy People' – have accumulated a record of successes having won the National Professional Soccer League title in 1971, 1973, 1975 and 1976, the National Soccer League title in 1994, and the Premier Soccer League title four times, in 2001, 2003, 2011 and 2012. Their first-place finish in the 2010–11 domestic league campaign generated much excitement among the club's vast fan base.

In 2011, Orlando Pirates enjoyed tremendous success by winning the 2010–11 Premier Soccer League, The Nedbank Cup, The MTN 8 Cup and The Telkom Knockout. This year was dubbed as "The Happy Year."

Many other cup triumphs in domestic football have also been recorded, including Vodacom Challenge title victories in the inaugural 1999 tournament and 2005. But the African continent and other areas of the football world took notice of Orlando Pirates Football Club when they won the African Champions Cup (now known as the Champions League) in 1995 and the African Super Cup a year later. Along with Mamelodi Sundowns, the Orlando Pirates are the only Southern Hemisphere club to have won the African Champions League. This achievement resulted in the club being honoured by the first State President of the new democratic South Africa, Nelson Mandela – another first for a South African sporting team.

Club chairman, Irvin Khoza, who also served on the 2010 World Cup Bid Committee, must be credited with the club's rise to fame over the past few years as the Orlando Pirates supporters – who are nicknamed "The Ghost" – have had much to cheer about.

Kaizer Chiefs chairman Kaizer Motaung and his Jomo Cosmos counterpart Jomo Sono were popular players of the highest calibre for the Buccaneers before starting their own clubs. Their playing history is deeply entrenched in the black and white colours of Orlando Pirates.

In 2005, the team, along with Interza Lesego and Ellis Park Stadium Ltd, announced its acquisition of a 51% share in Ellis Park Stadium, making it the first majority black-owned stadium in South Africa. It was in the same year that Orlando Pirates achieved Superbrand status. Superbrands is an international company that identifies and rewards the leading brands around the world; Orlando Pirates are the only South African sports team next to the Springboks and Proteas to be given this status.

The Soweto derby
The Soweto derby between Kaizer Chiefs and Orlando Pirates is one of the most fiercely contested derbies in world football. The first match between both clubs was on 24 January 1970.

Honours

Domestic competitions 
South African League titles (9):
Premier Soccer League
Champions (4): 2000–01, 2002–03, 2010–11, 2011–12
Runners up (6): 1999–2000, 2004–05, 2005–06, 2008–09, 2017–18, 2018–19
National Soccer League
Champions (1): 1994
National Professional Soccer League
Champions (4): 1971, 1973, 1975, 1976

Cup competitions  

Nedbank Cup
Champions (8): 1973, 1974, 1975, 1980, 1988, 1996, 2011, 2014 
Runners up : 2005 (absa cup by then), 2016, 2017                        
Telkom Knockout 
Champions (1): 2011
Runners up : 2000 (Rothmans Cup by then), 2010,  2018
MTN 8  
Champions (11): 1972, 1973, 1978, 1983, 1993, 1996, 2000, 2010, 2011, 2020, 2022
Runners up : 2007 (SAA Super 8 by then), 2014

International competitions 

CAF Champions League
Champions (1): 1995 
Runners-up (1): 2013
CAF Confederation Cup
Runners-up (2): 2015, 2021-22
CAF Super Cup
Champions (1): 1996

Cup competitions (unofficial) 

Castle Challenge
Champions (1): 1992
Sales House Cup  
Champions (4): 1972, 1975, 1977, 1983

Reserve and Friendly

Carling Black Label Cup  
Champions (5): 2011, 2012, 2014, 2015, 2019
PSL Reserve League  
Champions (1): 2007
Vodacom Challenge  
Champions (2): 1999, 2005

Performance in CAF Competitions
NB: South African football clubs started participating in CAF Competition's in 1993, after 16 years of being banned from FIFA due to the apartheid system. The ban extended from 1976 to 1992.
African Cup of Champions Clubs / CAF Champions League: 11 appearances
The club appeared in the African Cup of Champions Clubs twice (1995, 1996) and have appeared in the CAF Champions League nine times from 1997 to date.

CAF Confederation Cup: 4 appearances
African Cup Winners' Cup: 1 appearance

CAF Super Cup: 1 appearance

Note
Orlando Pirates did not make an appearance in the CAF Cup, they qualified for the 2001 CAF Cup but withdrew from the competition. As the cup was intended for league runners-up their place in the tournament was then extended to Kaizer Chiefs who had finished third, but they declined as they had already qualified for the more prestigious 2001 African Cup Winners' Cup. Pirates' place in the tournament was then extended to and taken by Ajax Cape Town.

Overall matches

Crest and colours

Kit manufacturers and shirt sponsors

Club Ranking
Club ranking for 2021–22 CAF Champions League and 2021–22 CAF Confederation Cup will be based on results from each CAF tournament (Champions League and Confederation Cup) from 2017 to 2020–21.

Updated after CAF Champions League/Confederation Cup matches on 17 July 2021.

Orlando Pirates F.C. Currently Ranked 22nd, as they enter the 2021-22 CAF Confederation Cup after finishing 3rd in the 2020-21 DStv Premiership

Notable former coaches

 Walter Da Silva (1988)
 Shepherd Murape (1994)
 Joe Frickleton (1995)
 Viktor Bondarenko (1995–1996)
 Shaibu Amodu (1996–1997)
 Ted Dumitru (1999–2000)
 Gordon Igesund (2000–2001)
 Jean-Yves Kerjean (2001–2002)
 Kosta Papić (2004–2005)
 Milutin Sredojević (2006–2007)
 Bibey Mutombo (2007)
 Owen Da Gama (2007–2008)
 Ruud Krol (2008–2011)
 Júlio César Leal (2011–2012)
 Augusto Palacios (interim; 2012)
 Roger De Sa (2012–2014)
 Eric Tinkler (interim; 2014)
 Vladimir Vermezović (2014–2015)
 Eric Tinkler (2015–2016)
 Muhsin Ertuğral (2016)
 Augusto Palacios (interim; 2016–2017)
 Kjell Jonevret (2017)
 Milutin Sredojević (2017–2019)
 Rulani Mokwena (interim; 2019)
 Josef Zinnbauer (2019–2021) 
 Fadlu Davids & Mandla Ncikazi (interims; 2021–2022)
 José Riveiro (2022-current)

Club records

Most appearances: Happy Jele 401
Most goals: Benedict Vilakazi 52
Most capped player: Teko Modise 58 (South Africa)
Most appearances in a season: Senzo Meyiwa 51 (2013–2014), Oupa Manyisa 51 (2013–14) and Willy Okpara 51 (1994–1995)
Most goals in a season: Dennis Lota 23 (1999–00)
Record win: 9–1 v Olympics FC (Bob Save Super Bowl, 7 March 1999)
Record loss: 0–6 vs Mamelodi Sundowns (League, 11 February 2017) Loftus Versfeld Stadium, Pretoria
Most games unbeaten: 17 (1975, 2005)
Most goals scored in a season: 61 (1989)
Most goals conceded in a season: 60 (1986)
Most wins in a season: 19 (1990)
Fewest wins in a season: 5 (1985)
Most defeats in a season: 15 (1985)
Fewest defeats in a season: 3 (1994)

Premier Soccer League record

Coaching staff

Players

First team squad

(Captain)

References

External links

Official Twitter page
Official Facebook Page
PSL Club Info

 
Association football clubs established in 1937
Soweto
Premier Soccer League clubs
Soccer clubs in Johannesburg
1937 establishments in South Africa
CAF Champions League winning clubs
CAF Super Cup winning clubs